Irakli Robertovich Chezhiya (born 22 May 1992) is a Georgian professional footballer who for FC Khimki.

Club career
He made his debut in the Russian Second Division for FC Khimik Dzerzhinsk on 18 September 2012 in a game against FC Dnepr Smolensk. He made his Russian Football National League debut for Khimik on 13 July 2013 in a game against FC Baltika Kaliningrad. 

He made his Russian Premier League debut for FC Khimki on 15 October 2022 against FC Fakel Voronezh.

Career statistics

References

External links
 
 

1992 births
People from Gali District, Abkhazia
Russian people of Georgian descent
Living people
Russian footballers
Association football midfielders
FC Spartak Moscow players
FC Khimik Dzerzhinsk players
FC Arsenal Tula players
Ulisses FC players
FC Armavir players
FC Shukura Kobuleti players
FC Olimp-Dolgoprudny players
FC Khimki players
Russian Second League players
Russian First League players
Armenian Premier League players
Erovnuli Liga players
Russian Premier League players
Russian expatriate footballers
Expatriate footballers in Armenia
Russian expatriate sportspeople in Armenia
Expatriate footballers in Georgia (country)
Russian expatriate sportspeople in Georgia (country)